Rebecca Liua'ana (born 21 September 1970) is a former rugby union player. She made her debut for New Zealand against Canada on 16 October 1999 at Palmerston North. She competed at the 2002 Women's Rugby World Cup. Luia'ana was impressive in her teams trouncing of Australia in their quarter-final match. She scored a try in their semifinal victory over France.

Liua'ana featured in two test matches against England in 2001. She was part of the Wellington team that defeated Auckland and won the 2006 NPC final.

Wellington Rugby named their Women's Round 1 Division 1 trophy after her, the Rebecca Liua'ana Trophy.

References

External links 

 Black Ferns Profile

1970 births
Living people
New Zealand women's international rugby union players
New Zealand female rugby union players